Alexandra Vydrina (2 July 1988 – 16 September 2021) was a Russian linguist and researcher at the French National Centre for Scientific Research (Paris) specializing in research on African languages of Guinea.

Life and contributions
Vydrina received her education at St. Petersburg State University and in 2008 started working on the Kakabe language of Guinea, a Mande language spoken in the Fouta Djallon highland region. She was a doctoral student at INALCO (Paris), and had postdoctoral positions in the CNRS and at the Higher School of Economics (Moscow).

She completed a dictionary of Kakabe in 2015, and a comprehensive grammatical description in 2017. She also contributed to general questions of the interaction of tone and intonation with information structure, of modality, and of small-scale multilingualism from the perspective of her research on the Kakabe language.

Works

Major works on Kakabe

 Available in open access: https://tel.archives-ouvertes.fr/tel-01801759

Further research articles

Secondary sources 
 Guillemain, Franck. 2019. Sasha Vydrina, la langue kakabé en Guinée. Documentary film. 17 minutes. https://www.canal-u.tv/video/cnrs_ups2259/sasha_vydrina_la_langue_kakabe_en_guinee.50573
 Konoshenko, Maria. 2021. In memoriam: Alexandra Vydrina (1988-2021). Language in Africa 2(3). 3–10. (doi:10.37892/2686-8946-2021-2-3-3-10)

Notes

External links 
Page at CNRS-LACITO
Page at Laboratoire de Phonétique et Phonologie
Page at Google Scholar

1988 births
2021 deaths
People from Leningrad Oblast
Linguists from Russia
Linguists of Mande languages
Russian Africanists
21st-century linguists
Saint Petersburg State University alumni
French National Centre for Scientific Research scientists
Women linguists